Anders Bille (19 March 1600 – 10 November 1657) was the Danish Rigsmarsk, the officer leading the entire armed forces of Denmark, from 1642.

From 1635 to 1643 he was the Governor of Ösel (Saaremaa).

He was mortally wounded in the defence of Fredriksodde during the Northern Wars against Sweden, and died after a few days in captivity. He was a member of the Bille family.

References

1600 births
1657 deaths
Danish generals
Anders